The 2012–13 Liga Nacional Superior de Voleibol Femenino (Spanish for: 2012-13 Women's Senior National Volleyball League) or 2012-13 LNSVF was the 9th official season of the Peruvian Volleyball League. Universidad César Vallejo won the league championship and qualified to the Women's South American Volleyball Club Championship.

Competing Teams

  Alianza Lima (ALI)
  Divino Maestro (CDM)
  Latino Amisa (CLA)
  Regatas Lima(CRL)
  Circolo Sportivo Italiano (CSI)
  Deportivo Wanka (DWK)
 
  Géminis (GEM)
  Sporting Cristal (SCR)
  Túpac Amaru (TUP)
  Universidad César Vallejo (UCV)
  Universidad San Martín (USM)
  Unión Vallejo Tarapoto (UVT)

Competition format
The 2012-13 season uses the same format as the previous edition, the first round is a double round robyn pool between all teams, after the round, the top 8 move on to the quarterfinal play-offs.

First round

The first round is a Round-Robyn system where all 12 teams will play once against the other 11 in home-and-away matches making a total of 132 matches in the round.

Pool standing procedure

1. Match points
2. Numbers of matches won
3. Sets ratio
4. Points ratio

Match won 3–0 or 3–1: 3 match points for the winner, 0 match points for the loser
Match won 3–2: 2 match points for the winner, 1 match point for the loser

Ranking.

|}

Final round
The final round of the tournament is a knockout stage, teams play the quarterfinals seeded according to how they finished ranking-wise in the second round.  This round is played best-out-of-three games, for a team to move on to the next stage, they have to win twice against the opposite team.

Final standing

Individual awards

Most Valuable Player
 Milagros Moy (Universidad César Vallejo)
Best Scorer
 Yonkaira Peña (Universidad San Martín)
Best Spiker
 Sidarka Nuñez (Universidad César Vallejo)
Best Blocker
 Florencia Busquets (Sporting Cristal)
Best Server
 Milagros Moy (Universidad César Vallejo)

Best Digger
 Susan Egoavil (Sporting Cristal)
Best Setter
 Verónica Contreras (Universidad César Vallejo)
Best Receiver
 María de Fátima Acosta (Géminis)
Best Libero
 Mirian Patiño (Universidad César Vallejo)

References

External links
LNSV

Volleyball competitions in Peru
2012 in volleyball
2013 in volleyball
2012 in Peruvian sport
2013 in Peruvian sport